The Bernie Grant Arts Centre (BGAC) is a £15 million purpose-built multi-arts centre, which includes a 274-seat auditorium, studio/rehearsal space, café/bar, enterprise centre and open spaces. It is located next to the Town Hall in Tottenham, North London. The centre was designed by David Adjaye and opened in September 2007.

It is named in honour of Bernie Grant, MP, who represented the area. It was an initiative started before his death in 2000, through which he aspired to create "a unique showcase for international multicultural talent".

References

External links

 

Grade II listed buildings in the London Borough of Haringey
Arts organizations established in 2007
Arts centres in London
Tourist attractions in the London Borough of Haringey